Bonoua is a town in south-eastern Ivory Coast. It is a sub-prefecture and commune of Grand-Bassam Department in Sud-Comoé Region, Comoé District.

In 2021, the population of the sub-prefecture of Bonoua was 118,388.

Villages
The fifteen villages of the sub-prefecture of Bonoua and their population in 2014 were:

References

Sub-prefectures of Sud-Comoé
Communes of Sud-Comoé